Johann Graf von Fries (19 May 1719 in Mulhouse, France – 19 June 1785 in Bad Vöslau, Lower Austria) descended from a Swiss family of bankers. He was a counsellor,  director of the imperial silk factories, industrialist and banker. His house in Vienna was the current Palais Pallavicini, built upon a monastery erected by Elisabeth of Austria, Queen of France (widow of King Charles IX of France) and closed in 1782 (the church is now the Lutheran City Church) . 

His son (and heir) was Count Moritz von Fries.

After his time as a mayor of Zürich he entered Austrian service. He was responsible for catering of the army.

Footnotes

Further reading 
 Christian Steeb: Die Grafen von Fries. Eine Schweizer Familie und ihre wirtschaftspolitische und kulturhistorische Bedeutung für Österreich zwischen 1750 und 1830. Stadtgemeinde Bad Vöslau, Bad Vöslau 1999,  (Dissertation).

External links  

 
 Stammbaum der Familie Fries

1719 births
1785 deaths
18th-century Austrian businesspeople
Swiss bankers
Austrian bankers
Austrian nobility
Mayors of Zürich
Businesspeople from Mulhouse
18th-century Swiss businesspeople
Counts of the Holy Roman Empire